Harold H. Chase (March 31, 1912 – October 24, 1976) was an American politician. He was Lieutenant Governor of Kansas from 1961 to 1965. A lawyer, he was educated at Phillips University in Oklahoma,  Washburn University, and  Kansas Wesleyan University.

References

1912 births
1976 deaths
Kansas Republicans
Lieutenant Governors of Kansas
Kansas lawyers
Politicians from Springfield, Missouri
Washburn University alumni
Kansas Wesleyan University alumni
Phillips University alumni
20th-century American politicians
20th-century American lawyers